The Taesong Fortress is an historical structure located in the relocated capital of Koguryo, presently in the city of Pyongyang, North Korea. It has been dated to the 3rd-5th centuries, during the Koguryo period). 

The walls of the fortress have a circumference of 7,218m. (Another source gives the walls as being 7,076 metres round with total length of its walls being 9,284 metres)  Built at the foot of Mount Taesong, the fortress provided protection for the capital, and held wells, storehouses and armories behind its walls. It remains one of the largest stone fortifications found in Korea in both length and size.

One can still find remains of the fortress today.

See also
 Pyongyang
 Anhak Palace
 Pyongyang Castle

References 

National Treasures of North Korea
Castles in North Korea
Buildings and structures in Pyongyang